The Juneau School District (sometimes referred to as the Juneau Borough School District) is a school district in Juneau, Alaska. Its office is located in Downtown Juneau.

The Juneau School District's total enrollment sits around 5,500 students.

Schools

Elementary (primary)
 Auke Bay Elementary School
 Gastineau Community School
 Glacier Valley Elementary School
 Harborview Elementary School
 Riverbend Elementary School
 Juneau Community Charter School 
 Mendenhall River Community School

Middle schools (junior high)
 Dzantik'i Heeni Middle School
 Floyd Dryden Middle School

High schools (secondary)
 Juneau-Douglas High School
 Thunder Mountain High School
 Yaaḵoosgé Daakahídi Alternative High School

Special programs
 HomeBRIDGE (homeschooling)
 Montessori Borealis  (elementary 1-6th grade & adolescence 7-8th grade)

See also
 List of school districts in Alaska

Notes

 Gastineau Community School is also known as Gastineau Elementary School. The school is called Gastineau Elementary School on the list of schools located on the district website  and called Gastineau Community School by the school website.

References

External links
 

Education in Juneau, Alaska
School districts in Alaska